Louis De Geer may refer to:

People:
Louis De Geer (1587–1652), industrial entrepreneur of Walloon origin 
Louis De Geer (1622–1695), industrial entrepreneur
Louis Gerhard De Geer (1818–1896), baron, Prime Minister of Sweden 1876–80
Gerhard Louis De Geer (1854–1935), baron, Prime Minister of Sweden 1920–21

Other:
Louis de Geer konsert & kongress, in Norrköping, Sweden 

De Geer, Louis